Amy Schwartz may refer to:

 Amy Schwartz (sportsperson) (born 1969), former American professional tennis player and amateur golfer
 Amy Schwartz (author) (1954 – 2023), American author and illustrator of children's books
 Amy Schwartz Moretti (born 1975), American violinist

See also 
 Schwartz (surname)